Tim Blais is a Canadian science communicator. He explains scientific topics via writing and performing a capella parodies of popular music which he records and posts on his YouTube channel, A Capella Science.

Early life and education
Blais was born in Hudson, Quebec. Blais states that he comes from an "incredibly musical" family. His mother leads a church choir; Blais joined the choir when he was three. He also plays drums, piano, and stringed instruments including guitar. Blais graduated from McGill University in 2011 with a Bachelor of Science degree. In 2013, he earned a master's degree in high-energy theoretical physics with honors from McGill.

Career
Blais created his first parody video in 2012, motivated by a desire to help people understand the world around them. He states that creating parody videos with a factual science theme came out of being fascinated by science, music (particularly a capella), and parody. He was inspired by "Weird Al" Yankovic, Bill Nye, Mike Tompkins, and Vi Hart. He was also inspired by the group The Maccabeats, an a cappella group that sings parodies of songs with replacement lyrics about Jewish themes. Blais has had an a cappella singing experience with Vancouver's Acapocalypse group.

In his solo videos, Blais performs all the tracks with his own voice, sometimes beat-boxing and creating brass sound effects. Most videos take a few hundred hours to complete.

Blais' first video parody was "Rolling in the Higgs", based on Adele's "Rolling in the Deep". The video was one of a handful of musical creations that followed the 2012 announcement of the discovery of a boson particle with Higgs-like characteristics. Blais' YouTube video generated over 17,000 hits in its first five days and had almost 800 thousand views as of April 2017. The video took Blais 60 hours to complete. Blais' second video, "Bohemian Gravity," parodied Queen's "Bohemian Rhapsody" to explain string theory. The video features a sock puppet portraying Albert Einstein. The work attracted the attention of Brian May, Queen's guitarist (who also holds a PhD degree in astrophysics), and May posted the video on his website.

Blais' YouTube channel has covered such topics as entropic time, exoplanets, and the discovery of insulin as a treatment for diabetes. Blais has collaborated with Dianna Cowern and others. Although Blais' career in science includes previous employment at the TRIUMF particle accelerator center in Vancouver, Canada, Blais makes a living from creating his videos, being supported by advertising revenue, sales of mp3s and posters, and contributions from fans via the Patreon website.

Blais also does public talks which include performances of his creations and as well as discussions of science culture and his experiences as a science graduate student and an artist in new media. In 2014, he was an artist-in-residence with the National Music Centre in Alberta, during which he experimented with new sounds and recorded tracks for an album. In 2015, he appeared on Canada's reality television program, Canada's Smartest Person, in which he won his episode but lost in the season finale.

References 

Year of birth missing (living people)
Living people
Canadian YouTubers
People from Montérégie
Science communicators